Juanita Fredrika Terblanche (née Hattingh, born 14 December 1970) is a South African politician. Prior to 2017, she was a Member of Parliament with the Democratic Alliance and the Deputy Shadow Minister of Science and Technology. Following her return to active politics in 2022, she was elected a caucus chair of the party.

Early life and education
Terblanche was born on the 14th of December 1970 to Chris and Ina Hattingh. Her father, a direct descendant of the Cape Colony free burgher Hans Heinrich Hattingh, was a Potchefstroom City Councillor before joining the Democratic Alliance and becoming a member of the North West Provincial Legislature.

Career
In 1998, Terblanche's father crossed the floor to the Democratic Party and she joined politics as an activist. She took part in the 1999 campaign, then won a by-election on the platform of the DP with 76% of the vote. By 2001, Terblanche was a Potchefstroom City Councillor alongside her father. She also held office as caucus chair, and was the North West provincial secretary from 2000 until 2004.

In 2004, she was elected a member of the National Council of Provinces, where she was best known for passing a 2004 motion censuring Thabo Mbeki for his attitude to rape. Later that year, Terblanche was elected as Whip in the NCOP and went on to serve a full term. She then became the representative for the constituency of Ventersdorp/Tlokwe (Potchefstroom).

From 2005 to 2006, she served as the first female Counsellor to the Leader of the Opposition, succeeding fellow MP Gareth Morgan. In 2009, she was the DA Home Affairs Spokesperson and again served as Whip, this time in the lower house. In 2011, she was the Democratic Alliance's candidate for mayor of Potchefstroom. She was also the constituency leader for Tlokwe when the DA briefly took control of the municipality in 2013.

In June 2014, Terblanche was named as Deputy Spokesperson in the Science and Technology portfolio.

In 2014, charges were laid against Deputy Minister for Higher Education Mduduzi Manana for, among other things, "manhandling" Terblanche in a brawl in parliament.

In October 2015, Terblanche was expelled from the Democratic Alliance, along with Dianne Kohler Barnard,  The ANC called it a "public relations stunt." Terblanche said the misconduct inquiry was "erroneous, misleading and defamatory" and said she would appeal to the High Court. 

She left parliament in 2017. Her membership of the Democratic Alliance was ultimately reinstated in February, 2022. She currently serves as one of the party's caucus chairs in her native North West Province.

Honours
Over the course of her career in politics, Terblanche was named as one of "the 200 young people that you should take to lunch" by the Mail and Guardian. She also received the Sunday Times award for "Upstart of the Year" and was further named as one of "the 100 young people that will make a difference in the next 10 years", again by the Mail and Guardian.

Illness
In April 2010, Terblanche was diagnosed with acoustic neuroma. She subsequently had the first of three corrective surgeries on July the 13th of that year.

After the three procedures were completed, some of the tumor remained due to both the nature of Terblanche's case in particular and the damage sustained during the final surgery.

She is currently continuing treatment.

Personal life
Terblanche is married to the lepidopterist Reinier Terblanche. They have three children together.

References

External links
 People's Assembly profile

Living people
Afrikaner people
People from Potchefstroom
Democratic Alliance (South Africa) politicians
Members of the National Assembly of South Africa
Women members of the National Assembly of South Africa
1970 births